The Motorola StarTAC, first released on January 3, 1996, is often assumed to be the first ever clamshell (flip) mobile phone. Technically, however, NEC had been releasing flip phones on NTT Docomo's PDC Mova network long before 1996, namely the TZ-804 and TZ-1501, both respectively launched in 1991 and late 1994. Another early precursor of this form factor was the Grillo, which was designed in Italy by Richard Sapper and Marco Zanuso in 1965. The StarTAC is the successor of the MicroTAC, a semi-clamshell design first launched in 1989. Whereas the MicroTAC's flip folded down from below the keypad, the StarTAC folded up from above the display. In 2005, PC World named the StarTAC as the 6th Greatest Gadget of the Past 50 Years (out of a list of fifty). The StarTAC was among the first mobile phones to gain widespread consumer adoption; approximately 60 million StarTACs were sold.

The StarTAC brand was revived in 2004 and 2007 for a series of flip phones exclusive to some Asian markets, and again for a cordless phone model.

History 
Motorola applied for the StarTAC trademark name in September 1995. The StarTAC was unveiled in North America on January 3, 1996. Then the smallest cell phone available, this AMPS phone was an immediate success. Successor TDMA and cdmaOne StarTACs were equally popular. GSM models were available in North America through Powertel, VoiceStream and other early GSM carriers. The StarTAC, which closely resembles Star Trek's Communicator, remained popular until the early 2000s, appearing in many Hollywood movies of the period such as 8mm starring Nicolas Cage. During its initial launch, magazine ads for the phone would include an actual size cardboard facsimile that could be pulled from the page to demonstrate the diminutive nature of the device.

The Motorola StarTAC mobile phone was introduced at the price of $1000.

Key features included:
 The ability to receive SMS text messages, although only the later digital models had the capability to send messages.
 A weight of approximately 88 grams (3.1 ounces)
 An optional lithium-ion battery, at a time when most phones were restricted to lower capacity NiMH batteries
 Vibrate alert (as an alternative to a ringtone)

Lekki
In October 2010, the now defunct French company Lekki, which refurbished iconic vintage products from the 1990s, released a line of refurbished StarTACs in new colourful bodies for €220 each.

Brand name revival

StarTAC 2004

The StarTAC name was revived in 2004 for a new model designed for the South Korean market. It had:
 A 128×160 262,000 TFT Color LCD
 64-channel sound
 A Mobile Banking feature supported by SK Telecom
 A 2,800-entry contact book
In addition, a version with an 18K gold directional keypad and brightwork was released as StarTAC 2004 SE.

The regular edition was released without the Mobile Banking function as the Motorola V628 in China. The 18K gold edition remained Korea-only.

StarTAC III
Motorola once again revived the StarTAC brand with the StarTAC III, announced on February 27, 2007.
 2-inch QVGA display
 GPS
 MP3 support
 128 MB built-in memory

Model list

Analogue phones
Most first generation analogue StarTACs feature LED displays as per Motorola tradition.

StarTAC 3000
The base model, which lacks the side volume controls, the smart button, and the contacts for an auxiliary battery. Also the only StarTAC model with a segmented LED display, as opposed to dot matrix LED displays found on other models.

StarTAC 6000e
Mid-tier StarTAC model, launched in 1996. Included one line LED display.

StarTAC 6000c
StarTAC 6000 updated in 1997 to include lower-cost one line LCD display.

StarTAC 6500
Identical to the 6000e, but included vibration. Released in 1996.

StarTAC 8500
The original StarTAC model, launched in 1996. Included two line LED display.

StarTAC 8600
Released in 1997, it included a built-in answering machine and a voice recorder with a recording capacity of 4 minutes.

StarTAC 70, 75, 75+, 80, 85, 90, Rainbow
The 70 and 80 series StarTACs are cosmetically identical, sharing the same housing and keypad layout. The 80 series models were released with higher resolution dot matrix displays, capable of displaying basic graphics like logos. The StarTac 70 series has only a two-line alphanumeric LCD.

The StarTAC 75 is the only single-band GSM 1800 model of the entire range excluding some carrier specific models. .

The StarTAC 70 was also sold in a multi-coloured edition, popularly known as the StarTAC Rainbow. The colourful casings could also be used to house the internal PCB and display from the 85, 7000g and 8000g. This would enable fans of the Rainbow series to have the features of the 85 such as the alphanumeric LCD display, or one which would operate on GSM 1900. These modified versions are often sold on the used market being touted as original.

StarTAC D

The StarTAC D was a GSM 900 model based on the 85 which allowed users to make mobile payments. The rear slot usually reserved for a full-sized (1FF) SIM card would instead take an EMV debit card or credit card. This was possible as both 1FF SIM cards and debit/credit cards met the same ISO/IEC 7810 specifications. The phone accepted a 2FF mini SIM card behind the battery for mobile network connectivity. The StarTAC D was the world's first dual-sim mobile phone.

The StarTAC D was released following a partnership between Barclaycard and Cellnet in the UK, and also France Telecom and Cartes Bancaires in France. 

A user could reload their debit card by inserting it into the phone and entering the withdrawal amount followed by a PIN code to load cash onto their card. In France, goods and services could be purchased by inserting the card into the slot and contacting the retailer. The price then appears on the screen and a password is entered to complete the transaction. Motorola eventually partnered with Giesecke & Devrient in Germany to offer similar services with their Geldkarte product.

StarTAC 130
The StarTAC 130 was released as a GSM 900 phone, although similar models that operated on the ETACS network were also produced. Along with the M6088, it was the only StarTAC to use a mini-SIM card (2FF). All other GSM models used a full-sized SIM card (1FF), the size of a standard debit/credit card meeting ISO/IEC 7810 specifications. 

On the used market there are many 130 models that are sold as dual-band, operating on GSM 900 and 1800. These can be identified by the boot screen which will say "Motorola Dual Band". However, these are not genuine Motorola releases but are instead modified phones using a 130 housing, and the internals of a StarTAC M6088. The M6088 is an almost identical model to the 130. The phones differed slightly with the M6088 having a different silver housing, a fixed antenna and no rear contact points for accessories. However, both models use the same software and button layout. The internal PCB, keypad and LCD are interchangeable between the housings. With the exception of being dual-band and not working with rear-clip on accessories, the phones appear identical.

The 130 was popular with car manufacturers who were offering car phones and hands-free phones in their models. As such, models of the 130 can be found with automotive logos such as BMW, Mercedes and Jaguar. These would also often contain boot screens with their respective logos. These were otherwise identical in terms of hardware. 

The cosmetically identical StarTAC X and Xe (it had a different TAC number) was sold in Asian markets.

MR501, MR701

The UK network operator Orange released two StarTAC models; the MR501 and the MR701. It was common practice at the time for Orange to release their own variants of popular phones with different model names. In this case, "MR' refers to Motorola. This was their naming convention at the time with "NK" for Nokia etc. These Orange-specific models would generally be the same cosmetically but would often include Orange branding, boot logos and be modified to operate on GSM1800 instead of GSM900 (providing the handset was single-band only). Of the four GSM networks in the UK at that time, Orange was one of the two that were GSM1800 only.

The MR501 is a variant of the StarTAC 70/75 and with the exception of the additional branding and GSM band was identical. 

The MR701 was a variant of the StarTAC 80/85. This model had some minor cosmetic changes compared to the original with a different keypad design. Like the MR501, it was modified to run on GSM1800. In addition to the Orange logo inside the clamshell, the phone displayed the Orange logo on bootup which it was able to do due to its higher resolution dot matrix display.

Both of these models came locked to the Orange network when purchased. Orange was merged with T-Mobile to become EE in 2010. EE still maintains the GSM1800 2G network, the only compatible network for these models in the UK.

The vast majority of these models on the second-hand market still have the original subscriber lock. The phone will request an unlock code if a non-Orange SIM card is inserted. In its original state, these phones can only work if one still has an active Orange SIM card. However, if unlocked both these models will function on the EE network (either directly or via an MVNO on EE's network).

Modern day use and network compatibility

Due to the popularity of the StarTAC, it has gained a cult following by enthusiasts and vintage mobile phone collectors. Despite its age, many models can still be used to this day in regions where cellular providers still operate a compatible network. For the most part, this is limited to GSM models operating on the 2G network.

Early models that used the analog AMPS network are now obsolete due to the shutdown of this network. 

Later GSM models continue to work in regions where 2G is available. Often these phones will first need to be unlocked to allow the use of SIM cards from modern cellular providers. Due to the price of the phone when new, the vast majority were purchased on contract. These models came locked to that particular provider, many of which are now defunct or have merged with other providers.

GSM StarTAC models were mostly single-band only operating on the GSM900 band. In some markets, variants were available that operated on GSM1800 for compatibility with certain carriers. The StarTac M6088 was the only commercially available dual-band model which was capable of using GSM900 and GSM1800 bands. Motorola did produce a prototype tri-band StarTAC 130 compatible with GSM900, 1800, and 1900 which would have made it the only model capable of working in both North America and Europe. While at least one of these models did make its way into private ownership, it was never made available for purchase by Motorola.

North American wireless carriers did not offer GSM StarTACs with their plans, instead opting to provide CDMA and TDMA variants of the StarTAC. 

GSM models were primarily released in Europe. These models do not work in North America as wireless carriers operate their 2G bands on GSM850 and GSM1900. 

Motorola released two GSM models for the US market; the 7000g and the 8000g. These are variants of the 70/75 and 80/85 respectively. While they are cosmetically the same and have the same features, both operate on GSM1900 instead of GSM900 thus making them compatible with the 2G networks available in the US. These models were only available to purchase directly from Motorola only and could not be purchased through a carrier. Most users opted to purchase a CDMA or TDMA model.

CDMA/TDMA models

Using CDMA and TDMA StarTACs in recent times has become increasingly difficult and now can no longer be done because AT&T shut down their 2G network in 2017. rendering TDMA models obsolete. Carriers such as Verizon still operate a compatible CDMA network. However, they will no longer activate CDMA StarTACs on their network as they are not E911 compliant. The FCC has made this a legally required feature for cellular phones. Verizon also requires that handsets on their network support HD Voice and VoLTE.

Users who wished to continue to use CMDA StarTACs following the introduction of E911 were able to do so for some time by activating them with a MVNO operating on Verizon's network such as PagePlus or Tello. MVNOs often didn't perform the proper due diligence to ensure a handset was compliant and allowed these handsets to be activated onto a new plan. This has since changed and activating a CDMA model is no longer possible.

With CMDA and TDMA models no longer working, this has made the aforementioned 7000g and 8000g models even more sought after by collectors as these can still be used with carriers that still support 2G such as T-Mobile.

GSM models

Most network providers across the globe still provide 2G services meaning GSM models can still be used to this day. The StarTAC 80 and 85 can have compatibility issues with modern SIM cards depending on the variant. However, all other models are fully compatible with modern SIM cards.

With the exception of the 130 which takes a 2FF mini-SIM, GSM StarTACS accept a standard (1FF) SIM card. This format follows the same dimensions as a conventional debit/credit card and was the format used in the first GSM phones before the switch to the 2FF standard. 

To this day, many cellular providers still deliver SIM cards in full-size cards which allow the user to remove the SIM card as either a Mini-SIM (2FF), a Micro-SIM (3FF), and Nano-SIM (4FF). 

Network providers do not advertise that these are 1FF size SIM cards as the format is considered obsolete. However, the spacing of the SIM is identical to that of a vintage 1FF card. These modern cards can simply be inserted into the handset as one piece. 

With the 1FF format being obsolete for some time, many providers are designing smaller SIM packs with the largest size provided being the 2FF format. In this case, the SIM can be transplanted into an adapter; either purchases or fashioned from another 1FF card.

GSM network locks

Due to the original price of these phones, the majority were purchased with a contract rather than directly from Motorola. When purchased with a cellular plan, the phone will come with a network lock meaning it will not accept a SIM card from another provider. 

If another SIM card is inserted, it will ask for a "special code"; usually referred to as a Network Unlock Code (NUC). Once this code has been entered, it will accept any SIM card and connect to any network providing it is compatible.

An unlock code would usually be obtained from the original network provider. However, due to the age of these phones, the codes are no longer available. Many of the original providers are defunct or have merged with other companies. 

In order to network unlock a StarTAC now, dedicated hardware is needed in order to change the lock status of the phone such as a RoEMMI Box or a Motorola Emmi Clip. These devices are able to reprogram the EEPROM and set the SIM lock flag.

Internally, Motorola developed a SIM card which when inserted would place the device in a service mode, allowing a technician to change parameters on the handset itself including the lock status. This card was never released to the general public although there are a small number of them in private hands.

TDMA/CDMA phones
 ST7760 (AMPS/TDMA)
 ST7762 (AMPS/TDMA)
 ST7790 (AMPS/TDMA)
 80071WNBPA (FCC IHDT5VG1) AMPS/TDMA (832/2412 MHz)
 ST7797 (Tri Mode/Dual Band 800/1900 MHz. TDMA/800 MHz. AMPS)
 ST7860 (Dual Mode/Single Band 800 MHz. cdmaOne/AMPS)
 ST7867w (Dual Mode/Dual Band 1900 MHz. cdmaOne/800 MHz. AMPS)
 ST7868 (Tri Mode/Dual Band 800/1900 MHz. cdmaOne/800 MHz. AMPS)
 ST7890 (Tri Mode TDMA?)
 ST7897 (Dual Band TDMA)

Gallery

See also
 Motorola DynaTAC
 Motorola MicroTAC
 Star Trek Communicator (1964)
 Grillo telephone (1965)

References

StarTAC
Mobile phones introduced in 1996
Computer-related introductions in 1996